RDML Stephen Frederick Williamson (born 1966) is a United States Naval officer.   In 2015, Secretary of Defense Ash Carter announced that President Barack Obama had nominated Capt. Stephen F. Williamson for the rank of Rear admiral (lower half).

Williamson reported as the director for Fleet Maintenance, United States Pacific Fleet in October 2015. He served as director of industrial operations at Naval Sea Systems Command beginning in September 2017.

In July 2019 Williamson was relieved of his command as director of industrial operations at Naval Sea Systems Command by Vice Adm. Thomas Moore after the Navy inspector general found that Williamson was having a consensual but inappropriate personal relationship.

Education
Raised in Silver Spring, Maryland, Williamson attended the University of Maryland and earned a Bachelor's Degree in Economics from George Washington University in 1988.  He attended the Naval Postgraduate School and became an engineering duty officer while earning his Master of Science degree in mechanical engineering in 1996.

Awards
 Navy Distinguished Service Medal
Legion of Merit
 Meritorious Service Medal (2 awards)
 Joint Service Commendation Medal
 Navy and Marine Corps Commendation Medal (3 awards)
 Navy and Marine Corps Achievement Medal (4 awards)

References

External links
 U.S. Navy Biography

1966 births
Living people
People from Bowie, Maryland
People from Silver Spring, Maryland
University of Maryland, College Park alumni
George Washington University alumni
Naval Postgraduate School alumni
Recipients of the Meritorious Service Medal (United States)
Recipients of the Legion of Merit
United States Navy admirals
Recipients of the Navy Distinguished Service Medal